Thiotricha oxyopis is a moth of the family Gelechiidae. It was described by Edward Meyrick in 1927. It is found on Samoa.

References

Moths described in 1927
Thiotricha
Taxa named by Edward Meyrick